The Pearse River is a river of the Tasman Region of New Zealand's South Island. It flows east from sources in the Wharepapa / Arthur Range, reaching the Motueka River 20 kilometres southwest of Motueka.

The source is a resurgence near the Nettlebed Cave. The resurgence has been dived to a depth of 245 metres and a diver had died in one attempt. At least three undescribed species have been found by divers in the resurgence.

See also
List of rivers of New Zealand

References

Rivers of the Tasman District
Rivers of New Zealand